Norway national bandy team represents Norway in the sport of bandy. The country has both a men's national team and a women's national team. This article deals chiefly with the men's national team.

Norway, Finland and Sweden played bandy at the Winter Olympics in Oslo in 1952. After having seen them there, the Soviet Union invited these three countries to a four nation bandy tournament in 1954. This was the first time a Soviet national bandy team met other national bandy teams. The four countries used somewhat different rules prior to this tournament, but the rules were adjusted to be the same for the future.

Norway has been competing in the Bandy World Championship since the second tournament in 1961. Norway finished in second place in 1965 and in third place 1993. 

Norway's best result in the Russian Government Cup is a second place in 1994.

World Championship record

Current squad 
Norwegian squad at the 2014 World Championship in Irkutsk, Russia, January 26 – February 2, 2014.

References 

National bandy teams
Bandy in Norway
Bandy